Match Point is an album by jazz pianist Roberto Magris recorded in Miami, released on the JMood label in 2021.

Reception

The  Los Angeles Jazz Scene review by Scott Yanow simply states: "Match Point is one of Roberto Magris’ strongest releases to date and is highly recommended to straight ahead jazz fans." The Aoide Magazine review by Eric Harabadian simply states: "This is one of Magris’ finest ensembles and a truly inspired selection of material blending straight ahead post-modern bop, with Latin rhythms and textures."

Track listing

 Yours Is The Light (Richard Kermode) - 10:37 
 Search For Peace (McCoy Tyner) - 15:00 
 The Insider (Roberto Magris) - 9:15 
 Samba For Jade (Roberto Magris) - 10:52 
 The Magic Blues (Roberto Magris) - 11:04 
 Reflections (Thelonious Monk) - 4:13
 Caban Bamboo Highlife (Randy Weston) - 7:02
 Match Point (Roberto Magris) - 7:09

Personnel

Musicians
Roberto Magris - piano
 Alfredo Chacon – vibraphone and congas
 Dion Kerr - bass
 Rodolfo Zuniga - drums

Production
 Paul Collins – executive producer and co-producer
 Edward Blanco – co-producer
 Carlos Alvarez – engineering
 Abe Goldstien and Jenna Beuning – design
 Paul Collins – photography

References

2021 albums
Roberto Magris albums